Xu Yunlong (born 17 February 1979) is a Chinese former footballer who played as a defender for Beijing Guoan and China national team.

Club career
Xu Yunlong started his football career with Beijing Guoan in the 1999 season, making thirteen league appearances and quickly established himself as a versatile player. By the following season, he continued to gain considerably more playing time for Beijing and would often be used as a right back where his pace was quickly exploited; however, after several seasons, he played increasingly more at centre back and become an integral member of the club's defense. Xu's importance towards the team was shown in the 2008 league season when he would be named as the club's vice captain and then later as their captain, leading the club to the league title during the 2009 season.

On 26 February 2017, Xu retired from football and became the Commercial Director of Beijing Guoan.

International career
Xu made his debut for the Chinese national team on 25 May 2000 in a 2-0 loss against Yugoslavia. Under then manager Bora Milutinović, Xu's international career flourished by keeping previous right back Sun Jihai out of the national team during the 2000 AFC Asian Cup. However, he was forced out of action due to illness and Sun regained his place within the team; nevertheless, his performances were still good enough to be called up the squad that participated in the 2002 FIFA World Cup.

International goals

Career statistics

1Other tournaments include Chinese FA Super Cup.

Honours

Club
Beijing Guoan
Chinese Super League: 2009
Chinese FA Cup: 2003
Chinese FA Super Cup: 2003

International
China PR national football team
East Asian Football Championship: 2005

Individual
Chinese Super League Team of the Year: 2003, 2006, 2007, 2009. 2013, 2014, 2015

References

External links
2002 China Team Player Profile at BBC website

Player stats at football-lineups website

1979 births
Living people
Chinese footballers
Footballers from Beijing
China international footballers
2002 FIFA World Cup players
2000 AFC Asian Cup players
2004 AFC Asian Cup players
Beijing Guoan F.C. players
Chinese Super League players
Association football central defenders
Beijing Guoan F.C. non-playing staff